Jerod Davanta Ward (born May 5, 1976) is an American former professional basketball player, who played shooting guard, small forward, power forward and center positions. Currently, Ward is a TEDx & Motivational Keynote Speaker, Consultant, Coach and College Basketball Analyst for networks including ESPN, Fox Sports and Spectrum Sports.

High school
Ward was the number one recruit in the nation winning the Naismith Prep Player of the Year award coming out of Clinton, Mississippi in 1994. The 1994 McDonald's All-American, First Team Parade & Slam magazine, USA Today, Basketball Times All-American scored 2,652 points with more than 800 rebounds in three varsity seasons at Clinton High School. As a senior, Ward averaged 29.8 points and 10.3 rebounds per game for the 26–3 Arrows. He posted 51 & 49 points games along with a 19-rebound game in his senior year campaign.  As a junior, Ward averaged 29.5 points and 9.3 rebounds while leading Clinton Arrows to the Class 5A state championship; averaging 33.5 points in the state in tournament.  As a sophomore, Ward averaged 27.5 points and 9.5 rebounds. He was coached by Joel Boone. In the 2009–10 season Ward was honored by Clinton High School retiring his number 32 jersey.

College career
In 1994, Ward signed with the University of Michigan and comprised part of its highly touted Fab Five II that included Travis Conlan, Maceo Baston, Willie Mitchell, and Maurice Taylor. Though plagued by injuries at Michigan, Ward ranked fifth in career three-point field goals.

Professional career
The six foot nine inch, 235 lbs forward  has played for the Grand Rapids Hoops of the CBA, In 1998–99, he averaged  14.9 points and 5.9 rebounds per game and was named to the CBA All-Rookie team. He also played for CB Granada in Spain, Cibona Zagreb (Croatia) and was part of the Toronto Raptors training camp in 2002.

References

1976 births
Living people
African-American basketball players
American expatriate basketball people in Croatia
American expatriate basketball people in France
American expatriate basketball people in Italy
American expatriate basketball people in Japan
American expatriate basketball people in Lebanon
American expatriate basketball people in South Korea
American expatriate basketball people in Spain
American expatriate basketball people in the Philippines
American expatriate basketball people in Venezuela
Basketball players from Jackson, Mississippi
CB Granada players
Grand Rapids Hoops players
JA Vichy players
Jeonju KCC Egis players
KK Cibona players
Liga ACB players
McDonald's High School All-Americans
Michigan Wolverines men's basketball players
Parade High School All-Americans (boys' basketball)
Power forwards (basketball)
Richmond Rhythm players
Toyama Grouses players
American men's basketball players
Philippine Basketball Association imports
TNT Tropang Giga players
Sagesse SC basketball players
21st-century African-American sportspeople
20th-century African-American sportspeople